Loretto School of Childhood is a private coeducational day school serving pupils in preschool through tenth grade (ages 2 to 16). The school was founded by Jude C. Ogu on 7 September 1998. However, it became fully operational on 8 September 2000. Currently, the school has its campuses situated at Rumuigbo and Igwuruta in Rivers State.

See also
List of schools in Port Harcourt

References

External links
 

Schools in Port Harcourt
1998 establishments in Nigeria
1990s establishments in Rivers State
Private schools in Port Harcourt
Secondary schools in Rivers State
Educational institutions established in 1998
Primary schools in Rivers State